Kentron TV (Armenian: Կենտրոն հեռուստատեսություն) is a private television broadcasting company in Armenia.

Programming
If Only
Dangerous Games
Amerikyan Patmutyun

References

External links 
Kentron tv official web
Armenian TV
Kentron TV

Television stations in Armenia
Armenian-language television stations
Television networks in Armenia